Moto G 5G and Motorola One 5G Ace are Android phablets developed by Motorola Mobility, a subsidiary of Lenovo. The Moto G 5G branded variant was initially released in December 2020.
In the United States, it was released as Motorola One 5G Ace on 13 January 2021.

Hardware

CPU 
It is the first device  to come with Snapdragon 750G System on Chip, a fast mid-range ARM SoC with 8 CPU Kryo 570 cores,
 Two fast ARM Cortex-A77 cores at up to 2.2 GHz
 Six small ARM Cortex-A55 cores at up to 1.8 GHz
and a fast X52 5G modem (up to 3700 Mbps download).
The SoC is manufactured in the modern 8 nm process.

Camera

Rear Camera System 
Device comes with 3 camera system,
 48MP (f/1.7, 0.8 um) camera which outputs 12MP (f/1.7, 1.6 um) Quad Pixel image using pixel binning for image quality improvement and uses PDAF
 8MP (f/2.2, 1.12 um) | 118° ultra-wide angle
 2MP (f/2.4, 1.75 um) | Macro Vision camera | AF
and a Single LED flash

Front Camera 
Device comes with a single punch hole front camera,
 16MP (f/2.2, 1 um) sensor that outputs 4MP (f/2.2, 2 um) Quad Pixel image

Software 
The device launched with Android 10 and as of October 2021 devices have started receiving Android 11 update.

Device comes with minimal customization to stock Android experience.
It includes Motorola My UX Gesture features such as Quick Capture, which launches the device camera with a twist gesture performed with wrist while holding the device, Fast Flashlight which turns on the device flashlight with two chopping motions.

OS Update History

Variants

Reception 
The reviewers praised the device for its clean user interface (minimal and tasteful customizations to Stock Android experience), good battery life, good performance and good camera. While criticising comparatively slow charging, bland design and average screen refresh rate.

References

External links 
 
 

Android (operating system) devices
Mobile phones introduced in 2020
Mobile phones with multiple rear cameras
Motorola smartphones
Mobile phones with 4K video recording